Myrcianthes rhopaloides is a shrub or tree in the family Myrtaceae. It is native to North and South America. Edible Fruit.

See also
Myrcianthes coquimbensis

References

Trees of Peru
rhopaloides